Chorki  is a village in the administrative district of Gmina Grabów, within Łęczyca County, Łódź Voivodeship, in central Poland.

The village has a population of 200.

References

Chorki